Tropical Heat Wave is a 1952 American musical film directed by R. G. Springsteen and starring Estelita Rodriguez, Robert Hutton and Grant Withers.

Plot

Cast
 Estelita Rodriguez as Estelita 
 Robert Hutton as Stratford E. Carver 
 Grant Withers as Norman 'Normie the Knife' James 
 Kristine Miller as Sylvia Enwright 
 Edwin Max as Moore 
 Lou Lubin as Frost 
 Martin Garralaga as Ignacio Ortega 
 Earl Lee as Dean Enwright 
 Leonard Bremen as Stoner
 Jack Kruschen as Stickey Langley

References

Bibliography
 Quinlan, David. The Illustrated Guide to Film Directors. Batsford, 1983.

External links

1952 films
American musical comedy films
1952 musical comedy films
Films directed by R. G. Springsteen
Republic Pictures films
American black-and-white films
1950s English-language films
1950s American films